Brychius glabratus is a species of beetle in the genus Brychius, discovered by two Villa siblings in 1835.

References

Haliplidae
Beetles described in 1835